Marta Sánchez Gómez (Torre del Mar, Málaga, June 28, 2000),  better known as Marta Sango, is a Spanish singer, songwriter, and actress who rose to fame after her participation in the program Operación Triunfo 2018.

Biography 
She was born on June 28, 2000, in the province of Málaga. Since she was a child, she took electric guitar lessons, and at the age of 14, she began to attend the Coral Joven Stella Maris in her hometown, Torre del Mar. Later, she was part of the a cappella group Artmonies. At the age of 18, she entered the academy of Operación Triunfo.

Trajectory

2018: Operación Triunfo 
Marta Sango participated in the casting of  Operación Triunfo 2018, she managed to pass all the phases and was selected to participate in Gala 0 of the program, where she was finally chosen as one of the 16 contestants of the edition.

Among her most outstanding performances within the program are Leave me alone by Michael Jackson and One more try by George Michael. She was nominated on four occasions and was finally voted out on the 11th gala, occupying the 7th position in the contest.

Once the program was over, all the contestants toured Spain, performing in emblematic venues such as the WiZink Center in Madrid and the Palau Sant Jordi in Barcelona.

2019: Beginnings, La Llamada, First Single 
After leaving the academy, she participated in gala 3 of the program La Mejor Canción Jamás Cantada, where she had to interpret the song Ave María by David Bisbal, which was the winning song of this gala dedicated to the decade of the 2000s. In April, the final of the program took place, and in this opportunity, Marta Sango interpreted the song La Flaca by Jarabe de Palo, finally obtaining the third position in the program.

Since October 16, 2019, she has been playing the role of Susana Romero in the musical La Llamada.

On December 27, 2019, she released her first solo single titled Por ti under the record label  Universal Music.

2020 
On December 29, 2020, she will release her second single, ¿Qué más quieres de mí? on the  Blanco y Negro Music label.

2021–2022 
Marta Sango is currently still part of the cast of the musical La Llamada.

On December 10, 2021, RTVE announced that Marta Sango was one of the artists chosen to participate in the Benidorm Fest with her song titled Sigues en mi mente, a song with which she opted to represent Spain in the Eurovision Song Contest 2022. Finally, she would be eliminated in the second semifinal, occupying the 10th position in the festival.

On February 18, she released the intro called Disparar as a preview of her future new album to be released in 2022.

After that intro of what will be her first album, Marta released on March 25 another new single titled Escapar, with a video clip included.

At the beginning of April, it was announced that she would be part of the 'Weekend Beach Festival' held in July in Torre del Mar, her hometown.

For the second consecutive year, Marta is also part of the "Atlantic Pride" on July 8, held in A Coruña.

This same year, together with her dancers Andoni and Manu, Marta Sango was part of the promotional short film of Netflix Spain to support the candidacy of Chanel Terrero in the Eurovision Song Contest 2022.

On Friday, May 20, 2022, Marta participates as a special guest at the welcome to Cool Fest in Fuengirola, at the Miramar Shopping Center.

Discography

Singles

Theater

Filmography

Theater

Series

Short films

Awards and nominations

BroadwayWorld Spain

Actuality Awards

References 

Spanish pop singers
Spanish women singers
Living people
2000 births
Benidorm Fest contestants
Operación Triunfo contestants